IBM Microelectronics Division was the semiconductor arm of International Business Machines Corporation (IBM) from 1966 to 2015. Two facilities in Burlington, Vermont, and East Fishkill, New York, housed the majority of the division. It was sold to GlobalFoundries in 2015; as part of the agreement, IBM gave its Burlington and East Fishkill factories and $1.5 billion in cash to GlobalFounderies in exchange for the latter supplying high technology chips to IBM for a decade.

History
IBM Microelectronics took root from the opening of two separate facilities for microelectronics: a Burlington, Vermont, facility in 1957, and the Hudson Valley Research Park facility in 1963. The Microelectronics Division was formally organized in 1966. By 2001, its operations also comprised offices in North Carolina, Minnesota, Colorado. It also had a plant in Quebec.

The Burlington facility spanned  and was the primary site of domestic semiconductor manufacture for IBM before 2002. In 1966, this factory produced the first mass manufactured semiconductor DRAM, based on Robert H. Dennard's patents developed for IBM in 1966. Such chips were later used in the company's System/370 Model 145 mainframe, the first computer built entirely from integrated circuits, abandoning the core memory of old. Employment in the Burlington facility peaked in the mid-1990s, with roughly 8,500 employees. Meanwhile, The Hudson Valley Research Park facility in East Fishkill, New York, spanned  and was the primary site of semiconductor wafer and packaging manufacture after 2002.

In 2002, as part of a wave of major layoffs within IBM cutting 15,600 jobs by August that year, the company let go 1,500 people in their Microelectronics facility in Burlington and East Fishkill. This layoff primarily affected the former, which had employed 7,000. Executives at IBM called the layoffs part of a restructuring of the Microelectronics Division, whose business was to move toward operating as a chip foundry on a contract basis, instead of mass manufacturing its own wares to sell onto the semiconductor market. A large portion of IBM's Microelectronics operations in Vermont was spun off into a new company, Endicott Interconnect Technologies (EI), in 2002. Another layoff the Vermont factory in 2003 reduced the headcount by 500, with 6,000 employees remaining.

2015 sale to GlobalFoundries
Following a year of discussion, in 2015, IBM divested  its entire Microelectronics Division, now only comprising the East Fishkill and Burlington facilities, to GlobalFoundries—itself a spin-off of once long-time rival AMD. As part of the deal, IBM paid GlobalFoundries $1.5 billion in exchange for the latter supplying IBM with high semiconductor technology for the next decade. The Quebec plant remained unaffected by the deal, having been placed under IBM's Canadian subsidiary.

In June 2021, IBM sued GlobalFoundries for breach of contract, alleging that GlobalFoundries misused the $1.5 billion in unrelated ventures. IBM stated:
IBM depended on GlobalFoundries after investing heavily in a long-term mutual relationship. GlobalFoundries responded by taking IBM's money, and benefitting from IBM's knowledge, skill and assets. Though GlobalFoundries repeatedly assured IBM it would meet its commitments, GlobalFoundries instead abruptly and without any justification walked away from IBM while IBM was reliant on GlobalFoundries. GlobalFoundries has demonstrably failed to act as a reliable partner and supplier.
The lawsuit was issued among the current global chip shortage. A spokesperson for GlobalFoundries called the claims "meritless ... Quite frankly, this is very disappointing coming from a company we have such a long history and strong partnership with."

Products 
 PowerPC
 Cell Broadband Engine Architecture
 Solid Logic Technology
 IBM 386SLC
 IBM 486SLC
 Cyrix 5x86, a microprocessor designed by IBM Microelectronics for Cyrix

References

External links 
 
 

Microelectronics
GlobalFoundries
1963 establishments in New York (state)
2015 establishments in New York (state)
1957 establishments in Vermont
2015 establishments in Vermont
American companies established in 1957
American companies disestablished in 2015
Computer companies established in 1957
Computer companies disestablished in 2015
Defunct computer companies of the United States
Defunct computer hardware companies
Defunct semiconductor companies of the United States
Defunct technology companies of the United States